Martin Říman (born 11 May 1961 in Frýdek-Místek) is a Czech politician. In 1996–1998 he was a Minister of Transport. In 2002 he was elected a member of the Chamber of Deputies and since from September 2006 to May 2009, he was Minister of Industry and Trade.

Říman is a graduate of Brno University of Technology. He is married and his wife is a high-school teacher.

External links 
  Official biography

1961 births
Living people
Industry and Trade ministers of the Czech Republic
Civic Democratic Party (Czech Republic) MPs
Transport ministers of the Czech Republic
Civic Democratic Party (Czech Republic) Government ministers
People from Frýdek-Místek
Members of the Chamber of Deputies of the Czech Republic (2002–2006)
Members of the Chamber of Deputies of the Czech Republic (2006–2010)
Brno University of Technology alumni